Kure Kura Ibn Abdullahi was a Mai of Kanem. He was killed in a battle with the Sao. He was one of the four sons of Abdullahi I killed in the Sao wars.

Rulers of the Kanem Empire